Egyptian Third Division is a football division in Egypt. It is the third level on the Egyptian football league system. Egyptian Third Division is the largest league of the Egyptian Fourth Division, where just 3 teams qualify from 14 groups to the Egyptian Second Division.

Promote and Relegate System
The first teams of groups 1, 2, 3, 4 are promoted to Promotion League it takes Place from 2 legs, promoted the first to Egyptian Second Division.
The first teams of groups 5, 6, 7, 8, 9 are promoted to Promotion League it takes Place from 2 legs, promoted the first to Egyptian Second Division.
The first teams of groups 10, 11, 12, 13, 14 are promoted to Promotion League it takes Place from 2 legs, promoted the first to Egyptian Second Division.

As for Relegation, the last 3 teams in the general ranking of Group 9 "North Sinai" and Group 14 "Matrouh" relegate to Egyptian Fourth Division. And the last 4 teams of each of the remaining groups will relegate to Egyptian Fourth Division.

Participating teams

 This list is not inclusive. Please expand it if you can.

Groups Season 2018–19

3
Egypt